The 1889 Rhode Island gubernatorial election was held on April 3, 1889. Democratic nominee John W. Davis received 49.38% of the vote and the Republican nominee Herbert W. Ladd 39.13%. With no candidate attaining a majority of the vote it was decided by the Rhode Island General Assembly. In the same election, the Republican Party had won a small majority in the legislature and selected Ladd as Governor.

General election

Candidates
Major party candidates
Herbert W. Ladd, Republican
John W. Davis, Democratic

Other candidates
James Chace, Independent
Harrison H. Richardson, Prohibition

Results

References

1889
Rhode Island
Gubernatorial